The Theban Tomb TT20 is located in Dra' Abu el-Naga', part of the Theban Necropolis, on the west bank of the Nile, opposite to Luxor. It is the burial place of the ancient Egyptian Mentuhirkhepeshef, who was fan-bearer and mayor of Tjebu during the mid Eighteenth Dynasty, probably during the reign of Tuthmosis III. Mentuhirkhepeshef was the son of a lady named Taysent.

The scenes in the tomb include funeral ceremonies. People are shown carrying the coffin, there is a 'raising of the olive tree', and there are Nubian captives depicted. Another scene shows Mentuhirkhepeshef hunting in the desert. There are scenes showing wild sheep and one showing an ass giving birth.

See also
 List of Theban tombs

References

Theban tombs